Mixco is a city and municipality in the Guatemala department of Guatemala. It is next to the main Guatemala City municipality and has become part of the Guatemala City Metropolitan Area.  Most of Mixco is separated from the city by canyons, for which a multitude of bridges have been created. Ciudad San Cristóbal, one of Guatemala's largest cities, is located in this municipality. It is the second largest city in Guatemala Department, after Guatemala City, with a population of 465,773.

Administrative division 

The municipality is divided into zones with residential neighborhoods, villages, settlements and the municipal capital.  Due to its close proximity to Guatemala City, several villages were turned into residential neighborhoods.

From the residential neighborhoods it is excluded "La Florida", which separated from Mixco to join Guatemala City in 1958.

Mayors

Universities
 UruralG
 UPANA
 USAC
 URL
UNI

Sports
Deportivo Mixco football club play in the Guatemalan second division. They have been playing their home games at different locations and plan to build the new Estadio de La Tierra de Campeones.

In film
 In 1969, the Mexican-Guatemalan film El ogro, with famous Mexican comedian Germán Valdéz and Guatemalan actor Herbert Meneses was filmed on location in Tikal and Mixco. The scenes shot in Mixco include Germán Valdéz as an old church keeper and a group of children who listen to his old stories.

Climate

Mixco has a subtropical highland climate (Köppen: Cwb).

Geographic location

See also
 
 
List of places in Guatemala
Guatemala Department
Guatemala City

References

External links 

 
 History
 Municipalidad de Mixco (in Spanish)
 La Casa de La Cultura de Mixco (in Spanish)
 Mixco Tierra de Campeones (in Spanish)

Municipalities of the Guatemala Department